A Mudgar is a type of "Gada" mace from India, and it is generally considered to be made of wood, but can also be made of iron.

Usage
The mudgar appears is ancient Indian sculptures, where it is commonly held Yaksha deities, known as "Mudgarpanis" (Mudgar-holders).

An ancient Jain story named the Antagadadasao tell the story of a man named Ajjunaka who was worshipping the image of the "Yaksa who held a mace", when he was attacked by five bandits, an event which shaked is devotion to the Yashka. Afterwards the Yaksa possessed Ajjunaka, giving him the strength to kill the five bandits.

Nowadays, for training purposes when using Indian clubs, one or two wooden gada ("mudgar"), reaching up to 70 kilograms in weight, can be used: they can be swung behind the back in several different ways; this is particularly useful for building grip strength and shoulder endurance.

Examples

See also
Mace (bludgeon)

References

Weapons in Hindu mythology
Indian melee weapons
Weapons of India
Clubs (weapon)